Samuel Jenat (born 30 March 2001) is a Slovak football defender who plays for Slavoj Trebišov.

Club career

FK Pohronie
Jenat joined Pohronie in the February 2021 from Petržalka. He made his only appearance in the 2020–21 season under Jan Kameník, in a defeat against his former club in the Slovnaft Cup.

Jenat then made his Fortuna Liga debut for Pohronie in a second round and a first home fixture of the new 2021–22 Fortuna Liga season against Zemplín Michalovce on 31 July 2021. Jenat was fielded ahead of stoppage time to replace Adler Da Silva and maintaining the two goal lead, established by Ladji Mallé and Miloš Lačný in the first half. Pohronie went on to win the game 2:0.

References

External links
 FK Pohronie official club profile 
 
 
 Futbalnet profile 

2001 births
Living people
Sportspeople from Žiar nad Hronom
Slovak footballers
Association football defenders
Slovakia youth international footballers
FK Železiarne Podbrezová players
FC Petržalka players
FK Pohronie players
FK Slavoj Trebišov players
2. Liga (Slovakia) players
Slovak Super Liga players
3. Liga (Slovakia) players